Qaran Sara (also Romanized as Qāran Sarā; also known as Qārūn Sarā) is a village in Farim Rural District, Dodangeh District, Sari County, Mazandaran Province, Iran. At the 2006 census, its population was 261, in 63 families.

References 

Populated places in Sari County